The October 2011 Baghdad bombings were a series of bombing attacks that hit the capital of Iraq between 7 and 13 October 2011. The first attacks took place on 7 October when a magnetic bomb and two IED blasts killed 7 and injured 39 in the north and south districts of Baghdad. On 10 October three explosions hit the mainly Shia neighborhood of Washash, killing ten and injuring 18 more. Two days later a string of bombings and shootings took place all across the city - at least two police stations in the northwestern and central districts were attacked by suicide car bombers, killing 22 (including 13 policemen) and leaving at least 55 wounded. In total at least 29 people died on this day and 86 were injured. On the next evening four powerful roadside bombs exploded next to a local market and a crowded coffeeshop in the Sadr City district, killing 18 and injuring 47.

See also

 List of terrorist incidents, 2011

References 

2011 murders in Iraq
21st-century mass murder in Iraq
Mass murder in 2011
Suicide car and truck bombings in Iraq
Suicide bombings in Baghdad
Spree shootings in Iraq
Bombings in the Iraqi insurgency
Terrorist incidents in Iraq in 2011
Islamic terrorist incidents in 2011
2010s in Baghdad
Terrorist incidents in Sadr City
October 2011 events in Iraq